The glandular structure of the testis consists of numerous lobules.

Their number, in a single testis, is estimated by Berres at 250, and by Krause at 400. Anatomic studies have demonstrated figures of 250–290 for the same.

They differ in size according to their position, those in the middle of the gland being larger and longer.

The lobules are conical in shape, the base being directed toward the circumference of the organ, the apex toward the mediastinum testis.

Each lobule is contained in one of the intervals between the fibrous septa which extend between the mediastinum testis and the tunica albuginea, and consists of from one to three, or more, minute convoluted tubes, the tubuli seminiferi.

Additional images

References

External links
  - "Inguinal Region, Scrotum and Testes: Testis"

Mammal male reproductive system